CKCS may refer to:

 CKCS-TV, a television station (channel 32) licensed to Calgary, Alberta, Canada
 Cavalier King Charles Spaniel, a small breed of dog